The  is a major railway line connecting Tokyo (Shibuya) to Yokohama. The line is owned and operated by the private railway operator Tokyu Corporation. The name of the line, Tōyoko (東横), is a combination of the first characters of Tōkyō (東京) and Yokohama (横浜). The Tōyoko Line is the mainline of the Tokyu network. The section between Den-en-chofu and Hiyoshi Station is a quadruple track corridor with the Tōkyū Meguro Line.

Services

Upon opening of the Tōkyū Shin-Yokohama Line in March 2023, the typical weekday off-peak services are as follows: 
 Northbound: 18  of which 2 join the line from 
 2 tph F Liner for  via the Tokyo Metro Fukutoshin Line and Tōbu Tōjō Line
 2 tph F Liner for  via the Tokyo Metro Fukutoshin Line, Seibu Yurakucho & Ikebukuro Line 
 2 tph Local for  via the Tokyo Metro Fukutoshin Line, Seibu Yurakucho & Ikebukuro Line 
 Southbound: 18 tph
 4 tph F Liner for  via the Minatomirai Line
 4 tph Express for  via the Minatomirai Line
 2 tph Express for  via the Tōkyū Shin-Yokohama Line, Sotetsu Shin-Yokohama Line, Sotetsu Main Line, and Sōtetsu Izumino Line
 8 tph Local for  via the Minatomirai Line

S-Train

Limited Express (Tōyoko Express) 

 is the fastest service provided on the line at no extra charge. These type of trains can complete the journey between Shibuya and Motomachi-Chukagai in 35 minutes. Most Limited Express trains are through service to Tokyo Metro Fukutoshin Line and some to the Tobu Tojo Line or Seibu Ikebukuro Line via Fukutoshin Line. All Limited Express trains are through service to the Minatomirai Line. Trains that continuously and completely operate as express services through Tobu/Seibu, Tokyo Metro, Tokyu, and Yokohama Minatomirai railways are dubbed as "F-Liner" services. In daytime, connects to a local train at Jiyūgaoka, Musashi-Kosugi (Only inbound train passing a local train at Motosumiyoshi), and Kikuna.

Commuter Express 
 is an express train with more stops that operates in the AM and PM rush hours during the weekday when Limited Express trains are not operating. It is also guided as ”Commuter Limited Express” in some cases. Most Commuter Limited Express trains will through operate into Tokyo Metro Fukutoshin Line as Commuter Express trains and beyond into the Tobu Tojo and Seibu Ikebukuro lines as Rapid services.

Express 
 trains operate all day. Upbound-wise some Express Trains will through operate into Tokyo Metro Fukutoshin Line as local services. In daytime, connects to a local train at Jiyūgaoka and Kikuna. Downbound-wse, some Express Trains will through operate into  after  instead of continue onward to /.

Local 
 trains stop at all stations.

Most Limited Express and Express trains are 10 cars long, and all local trains are 8 cars long.

Through operation

Tokyo Metro Fukutoshin Line 
On 16 March 2013, the section of the Tōyoko line between Shibuya and Daikanyama Station was put underground, and connected to the Tokyo Metro Fukutoshin Line platforms at Shibuya.  Through an engineering project culminating in a dramatic single overnight maneuver, the existing surface rail line was disconnected, sunken, and reconnected with the new underground line in time for the normal morning train schedule to run.  

The re-routing allowed for through operation between the Tōyoko and Fukutoshin lines. Since opening of the Fukutoshin Line in 2008, trains would through operate between the Seibu Ikebukuro line (via Seibu Yurakucho line) and the Tobu Tojo line at the northern end of the Fukutoshin Line. The new connection allows trains from Tobu Railway, Seibu Railway, Tokyo Metro, Tokyu Corporation and Yokohama Minatomirai Railway to operate trains in a common corridor. As a result of the new connection, the original elevated Shibuya terminal for Tokyu trains was abandoned and demolished.

Minatomirai Line 
On 1 February 2004, Tōyoko line was realigned underground between Tammachi and Yokohama stations to enable through services with the Minatomirai Line. The original alignment to Yokohama Station was demolished and turned into a rail trail.

Tokyo Metro Hibiya Line 
Through operation with the Tokyo Metro Hibiya Line started on 29 August 1964, with trains starting at Hiyoshi station will travel into Kita-Senju Station via a connection to the Hibiya Line at Naka-Meguro Station. In 1988, this service was extended to Kikuna Station temporarily during the realignment of Hiyoshi station to an underground corridor, but was retained as official service due to its popularity.

On 15 March 2013, with the start of through service with Fukutoshin Line, services to and from the Hibiya Line were discontinued. Passengers must transfer between lines at Naka-Meguro Station.

Tokyu Shin-Yokohama Line and Sagami Railway 
Through operation with the Tōkyū Shin-Yokohama Line and the Sagami Railway network started on 18 March 2023, with trains starting at Wakoshi station on the Fukutoshin Line travelling into Shin-Yokohama and Shonandai via a connection to the Tōkyū Shin-Yokohama Line at Hiyoshi Station.

The connection starts at Hiyoshi Station and head to Sōtetsu Main Line's Nishiya Station. New stations are set up at Tsunashima Station, Shin-Yokohama Station and Hazawa Yokohama Kokudai Station. However, when a concrete plan was specified in November 2008 for Tsunashima station, the plan was changed to the establishment of a " Station" to be constructed near Tsunashima station.

Stations
Key:
O: stop; |: pass, ※: no passengers

Rolling stock
 Tokyu 5000 series 8-car EMUs
Tokyu 5050 series 8-car EMUs
 Tokyu 5050-4000 series 10-car EMUs
 Yokohama Minatomirai Y500 series 8-car EMUs
 Tokyo Metro 10000 series 10-car EMUs (since September 2012)
 Tokyo Metro 17000 series 8/10-car EMUs (since February 2021)
 Tobu 9000 series 10-car EMUs (since March 2013)
 Tobu 50070 series 10-car EMUs (since March 2013)
 Seibu 6000 series 10-car EMUs (since March 2013)
 Seibu 40000 series 10-car EMUs (since 25 March 2017)
 Sotetsu 20000 series 10-car EMUs (since 18 March 2023)

Eight-car Tokyo Metro 10000 series sets entered revenue service on the Tokyu Tōyoko Line and Minatomirai Line from 7 September 2012. These 8-car sets were subsequently reformed back into 10-car sets.

Former rolling stock
 Tokyu 1000 series 8-car EMUs
 Tokyu 3000 series 8-car EMU
 Tokyu 8000 series 8-car EMUs
 Tokyu 8090 series 8-car EMUs
 Tokyu 8500 series 8-car EMUs
 Tokyu 9000 series 8-car EMUs (until 15 March 2013)
 Tokyo Metro 03 series (until 15 March 2013)
 Tokyo Metro 7000 series 8/10-car EMUs (from September 2012 until April 2022)

History

The first section of the line from Tamagawa to Kanagawa (separate from the present Kanagawa of Keikyu) opened on 14 February 1926. On 29 August 1964, through service to the Tokyo Metro Hibiya Line via Naka-Meguro Station was started.

From 1 February, Tokyu Toyoko Line trains started through service from Yokohama to the Minatomirai Line.

On 16 March 2013, the  section between Shibuya to Daikan-yama was replaced with an underground connection to the Tokyo Metro Fukutoshin Line. The original ground-level terminal platforms were closed after the last service at 1 am that morning. Just four hours later, at 5 am, trains began calling at a new set of underground platforms adjacent to those previously served only by the Fukutoshin Line. During this time, 1,200 workers shifted the track alignment at Daikan-yama Station along a pre-built incline.
Since that day, Tokyu and Yokohama Minatomirai Railway trains commenced through running onto the Fukutoshin Line and beyond. Tokyo Metro, Tobu, and Seibu also started operating their trains through to the Tōyoko and Minatomirai Lines. At the same time, through service on Hibiya Line ended.

In 2022, Tokyu announced the commencement of "Q-Seat" service on the Tōyoko Line for fiscal 2023. The Tōyoko Line will be the second Tokyu line to feature reserved seating services, the first being the Oimachi Line. Therefore, 5050 series 8-car set 5166 was reformed as 10-car set 4112 with two newly built “Q-Seat” cars. They feature the same livery used for the Oimachi Line, however were painted in red instead of orange. Set 4112 is currently undergoing testing and is being stored at Nagatsuta Depot. The cars started service on 24 October 2022 with "Q-Seat" services beginning in February 2023.

Incidents and accidents
On 15 February 2014, two trains collided and derailed at Motosumiyoshi station resulting in nineteen injuries. Heavy snow and operations continuing at normal speed were seen as likely causes.

Future developments
Platform edge doors are scheduled to be installed at all stations on the line by 2020.
On 13 May 2022, Tokyu Corporation announced its decision to implement driver-only operation on the Tōyoko Line by fiscal 2023, at the earliest. The Tōyoko Line fleet is due to be modified accordingly.

See also
 List of railway lines in Japan

References

External links

 Tokyu Corporation website 

Lines of Tokyu Corporation
Railway lines in Tokyo
Railway lines in Kanagawa Prefecture
1067 mm gauge railways in Japan
Railway lines opened in 1926
1926 establishments in Japan